Emeryson was a Formula One constructor briefly in , and then again briefly in  and .

Complete Formula One World Championship results

Works entries
(key)

* Constructors' Championship not awarded until 1958

Results of other Emeryson cars
(key)

External links
 https://www.hrscc.co.nz/formula-junior/emerysons/

Formula One constructors
Formula One entrants
1956 establishments in the United Kingdom
1962 disestablishments in the United Kingdom
British auto racing teams
British racecar constructors
Auto racing teams established in 1956
Auto racing teams disestablished in 1962